Brownlee Park is a census-designated place (CDP) in Calhoun County in the U.S. state of Michigan.The population was 2,108 at the 2010 census. The CDP is immediately east of the city of Battle Creek and is part of the Battle Creek Metropolitan Statistical Area.

The CDP includes both Brownlee Park and the adjacent community of Greenfield Park:

Geography

Transportation 
At the extreme southern portion of Brownlee Park is Michigan State Highway 96. A large portion of a railyard operated by Candian National lies on the west end of the CDP. Raymond Road, and Verona Road (which becomes Emmet Street entering Battle Creek), are notable examples of Stroads. Neither segment of road has pedestrian friendly infrastructure such as sidewalks or protected bike lanes despite connecting numerous subdivisions and three trailer parks to the rest of the community. Calhoun County is one of the few counties in the State of Michigan that does not have a county-level transit network. The nearest bus services and passenger trains operate within Battle Creek.

Education 
Brownlee Park is home to the Doris Klaussen Developmental Center, a school run by the Calhoun County ISD which serves special needs and disabled children. It has nurses on site in conjunction to teaching staff, with multiple programs to cater to children, from those with moderate cognitive impairment to severe multiple debilities. Their mascot is The Cougars.

Parks and Recreation 
Brownlee Park has direct access to the North Country Trail, which passes through the CDP via a mile long segment of crushed gravel pathway that is also a portion of the Calhoun County Trailway. The trail continues as sidewalk over the Veterans Memorial Bridge westward to interconnect with Battle Creek's Linear Park, and southward to the Ott Biological Preserve, lying just outside the CDP boundary. This portion of trail is also a segment of the Iron Belle Trail. Bikes and hikers are allowed on the trail, however motor vehicles are not. 

To the immediate West is Battle Creek's Bailey Park, a large complex of playgrounds, greenspace, baseball diamonds, soccer fields and a dog park. Bailey Park contains MCCU Field inside C.O. Brown Stadium, home to the Battle Creek Battle Jacks.

Demographics

As of the census of 2000, there were 2,588 people, 1,027 households, and 659 families residing in the CDP. The racial makeup of the CDP was 91.11% White, 2.70% Black or African American, 1.00% Native American, 0.66% Asian, 0.08% Pacific Islander, 1.51% from other races, and 2.94% from two or more races. Hispanic or Latino of any race were 4.21% of the population.

There were 1,027 households, out of which 32.3% had children under the age of 18 living with them, 39.5% were married couples living together, 19.8% had a female householder with no husband present, and 35.8% were non-families. 29.0% of all households were made up of individuals, and 10.1% had someone living alone who was 65 years of age or older.  The average household size was 2.50 and the average family size was 3.05.

In the CDP, the population was spread out, with 27.7% under the age of 18, 9.4% from 18 to 24, 31.4% from 25 to 44, 20.9% from 45 to 64, and 10.5% who were 65 years of age or older.  The median age was 34 years. For every 100 females, there were 90.4 males.  For every 100 females age 18 and over, there were 87.7 males.

The median income for a household in the CDP was $26,694, and the median income for a family was $32,644. Males had a median income of $27,400 versus $20,813 for females. The per capita income for the CDP was $17,026.  About 16.0% of families and 19.0% of the population were below the poverty line, including 30.3% of those under age 18 and 9.7% of those age 65 or over.

References

Unincorporated communities in Calhoun County, Michigan
Census-designated places in Michigan
Unincorporated communities in Michigan
Census-designated places in Calhoun County, Michigan